The 2020–21 season was the 113th season in the existence of Inter Milan and the club's 105th consecutive season in the top flight of Italian football. In addition to the domestic league, Inter Milan participated in this season's editions of the Coppa Italia and the UEFA Champions League. The season covered the period from 22 August 2020 to 30 June 2021.

Inter were confirmed as league champions on 2 May 2021 with four rounds still to play, after closest challengers Atalanta failed to win their match against Sassuolo. It ended Juventus's nine-year grasp on the Serie A title and was the club's first league championship since 2009–10. In the Coppa Italia, Inter were eliminated by eventual winners Juventus by a 2–1 aggregate score in the semi-final stage. While in the Champions League, Inter were eliminated in the group stage, finishing last in their group, following a poor campaign in which they only managed a single win. It was the third successive occasion in which Inter failed to qualify out of the Champions League group stage.

On 26 May 2021, Inter confirmed that head coach Antonio Conte had left the club by mutual consent. The departure came amid rumors that the club would have to significantly cut salary costs and sell key players due to mounting debt from both the effects of the COVID-19 pandemic in Italy and ambitious spending in the previous seasons.

Kits

Players

Squad information
Players and squad numbers last updated on 23 May 2021. Appearances include league matches only.Note: Flags indicate national team as has been defined under FIFA eligibility rules. Players may hold more than one non-FIFA nationality.

Note: Serie A imposes a cap on the first team squad at 25 players, with additional requirements on homegrown players (marked as HG) and club-trained players (marked as CT). However, league rules allow for unlimited club-trained players that are under-21 (marked as U21).

Transfers

In

Transfers

On loan

Loan returns

Out

Transfers

Loans out

Loans ended

Notes

Pre-season and friendlies

Competitions

Overview

Serie A

League table

Results summary

Results by round

Matches
The league fixtures were announced on 2 September 2020.

Coppa Italia

UEFA Champions League

Group stage

The group stage draw was held on 1 October 2020.

Statistics

Appearances and goals

|-
! colspan=14 style="background:#dcdcdc; text-align:center| Goalkeepers

|-
! colspan=14 style="background:#dcdcdc; text-align:center| Defenders

|-
! colspan=14 style="background:#dcdcdc; text-align:center| Midfielders

|-
! colspan=14 style="background:#dcdcdc; text-align:center| Forwards

|-
! colspan=14 style="background:#dcdcdc; text-align:center| Players transferred out during the season

Goalscorers

Clean sheets

Disciplinary record

Last updated: 1 May 2021

Notes

References

External links

Inter Milan seasons
Inter Milan
Inter Milan
Italian football championship-winning seasons